Iván Romero Mingo (born 21 July 1980 in Madrid) is a Spanish retired footballer who played as a left back.

External links

1980 births
Living people
Footballers from Madrid
Spanish footballers
Association football defenders
La Liga players
Segunda División players
Segunda División B players
Tercera División players
Rayo Vallecano B players
RSD Alcalá players
Atlético Madrid B players
Atlético Madrid footballers
Polideportivo Ejido footballers
Gimnàstic de Tarragona footballers
Real Jaén footballers
Racing de Ferrol footballers
SD Eibar footballers